George Hardin Brown was an American scholar of medieval studies. The focus of his scholarship includes Anglo-Latin and Anglo-Saxon literature, especially the work of the Venerable Bede. Brown had a long academic career at many renowned institutions and has studied under other notable scholars in his field.  He died on November 6, 2021.

Education
Brown received his B.A. (1955), Ph.L. (1956), and M.A. (1959) degrees from Saint Louis University. He also studied theology in Austria before returning to the United States. Brown earned his Ph.D. from Harvard University in 1971, from a department that included scholars of medieval and oral literature such as Francis Peabody Magoun, Albert Lord, and Walter Ong.

Professional career
After receiving his Ph.D., Brown took a position at Stanford University, where he worked until his death and where he headed the Medieval Studies Program in the Stanford University School of Humanities and Sciences. In 1994 he gave the Toller Lecture, which is considered a foundational  work in early English textual studies.  In 1996, at the Bede Foundation in Jarrow, he gave the Jarrow Lecture. Before his death he was editing a new edition of Bede's historical works (Opera historica minora), to be published by Brepols for the Corpus Christianorum Series Latina.

Select bibliography

Books authored

Books edited

In honor of George Hardin Brown

References

American literary critics
Saint Louis University alumni
Harvard University alumni
Stanford University Department of English faculty
Living people
Fellows of the Medieval Academy of America
Year of birth missing (living people)